The Green Party (SZ) leadership election of 2010 was held on 14 November 2010. Ondřej Liška was elected for his second term when he received 125 votes of 209.

Voting
There were 4 Candidates besides Ondřej Liška - Karel Helman, Martin Marek, Giuseppe Maiello and Ivana Kyselková. 209 Delegates voted. Liška received 125 votes while Helman 35 and Maiello 27 votes. Marek received 5 votes and Kyselková 4.

References

Green Party (Czech Republic) leadership elections
Green Party leadership election
Green Party (Czech Republic) leadership election
Indirect elections
Green Party (Czech Republic) leadership election